Liberal Parliamentarians for Israel is an organization of pro-Israel parliamentarians in the Liberal Party of Canada.  The group was founded in 2002, and includes MPs such as Irwin Cotler, Joe Volpe and Carolyn Bennett.  Former parliamentarians Stephen Owen and Jim Peterson were also members.  As of 2006, it was chaired by Anita Neville and David Smith.

Footnotes

Liberal Party of Canada